Your Witness is a 1950 British drama film directed by and starring Robert Montgomery. It also features Leslie Banks, Felix Aylmer and Andrew Cruickshank. It was released in the U.S. as Eye Witness.

Premise
A leading American lawyer travels to London to defend an old friend from the Second World War who is facing a charge of murder.

Cast
 Robert Montgomery as Adam Heyward
 Leslie Banks as Colonel Summerfield
 Felix Aylmer as The Judge
 Andrew Cruickshank as Sir Adrian Horth KC
 Patricia Cutts as Alex Summerfield
 Harcourt Williams as Richard Beamish
 Jenny Laird as Mary Baxter  
 Michael Ripper as Samuel 'Sam' Baxter  
 Ann Stephens as Catherine Ann 'Sandy' Summerfield 
 Wylie Watson as Mr. Widgery, Red Lion Proprietor  
 Noel Howlett as Martin Foxglove KC, Sam's Barrister  
 James Hayter as Prouty
 John Sharp as Police Constable Hawkins
 Shelagh Fraser as Ellen Foster
 Dandy Nichols as Waitress
 Stanley Baker as Sergeant Bannoch
 Erik Chitty as Clerk of the Court
 Amy Dalby as Mrs. Widgely
 Wensley Pithey as Alfred 
 Hal Osmond as Taxi Driver

Critical reception
In The New York Times, Bosley Crowther wrote, "Robert Montgomery's 'Eye Witness,' which came to the Little Carnegie on Saturday, is an amiable combination of British and American cinema crafts, run up for pleasant diversion if not exceptional note"; and TV Guide rated the film two out of five stars, calling it a "Routine crime melodrama with another of the American heroes British audiences seem to like."

References

External links
 

1950 films
British drama films
1950 drama films
1950s English-language films
Films directed by Robert Montgomery (actor)
Films set in England
British black-and-white films
1950s British films